Mangalorean Protestants are Protestants from South Canara and Coorg districts of the Indian state of Karnataka.

The community
The Basel Mission began its work in the Mangalore area in 1834. The missionaries learned the local languages and made the new New Testament available in both Tulu and Kannada. The majority of early native converts were from the Tulu speaking communities. The Basel Mission also paved the way for the development of Mangalore as a major educational and industrial hub, by starting several cotton weaving mills, tile factories and educational institutions. The biggest denomination among Mangalorean Protestants is the Church of South India (CSI), composed of mainly Basel Mission and the Anglican Christians. They number about 60,434 and are spread over Dakshina Kannada, Udupi and Kodagu districts. The CSI runs the Karnataka Theological College, one hospital and some technical schools in the region. Other denominations include Jehovah's Witnesses, Pentecostals, Seventh-day Adventists, New Life Fellowship etc.

Notable Mangalorean Protestants
Stanley Jedidiah Samartha - Indian theologian
 Dr V.B. Hans, M.A., M.Phil., PhD (S/O Late Rev E. S. Hans) - Economist and Interdisciplinary Researcher; lay preacher/resource person for academic/theological institutions

See also

Mangalorean Catholics
Mangaloreans

References

Statistics of Mangalorean Protestants from the Roman Catholic Diocese of Mangalore.

Protestantism in India
Indian Protestants
Mangalorean society
Christianity in Mangalore
Christian communities of India
Social groups of Karnataka